This is a list of aviation-related events from 1932:

Events 
 The Canadian Siskins aerobatic team is retired.
 James Work founds the Brewster Aeronautical Corporation.
 Richard Ormonde Shuttleworth buys 1928 de Havilland DH.60X Moth G-EBWD, which he bases at Old Warden airfield in Bedfordshire, England, where it remains (as of 2012) – the longest continuous base for a single aircraft in aviation history.
 The French Armys Aéronautique Militaire retires the last of its Breguet 14 aircraft. The Breguet 14 had been in service since 1917.

January
 January 20 – Imperial Airways weekly airmail service is extended through Africa as far as Cape Town.
 January 26 – After the Stinson Model R prototype he is piloting runs out of fuel over Lake Michigan during a demonstration flight from Chicago, Illinois, Edward "Eddie" Stinson – the founder of the Stinson Aircraft Company – attempts to land the plane on a golf course. The plane's wing strikes a flagpole a shears off, and the plane crashes, killing Stinson and injuring the other three people on board.
 January 29 – Imperial Japanese Navy seaplanes from the seaplane carrier Notoro attack Nationalist Chinese military positions in Shanghai, China, beginning Japanese air operations in the Shanghai Incident. The operations, which will continue into February, are the first significant military air operations to take place in East Asia.
 January 30 – The Imperial Japanese Navy aircraft carrier Kaga arrives in Chinese territorial waters at the outbreak of the Shanghai Incident. The Japanese Navys use of aircraft carriers in the Shanghai Incident is history's first significant combat use of carrier-borne airpower.

February
 February 1 – The Imperial Japanese Navy aircraft carrier Hōshō joins the carrier Kaga in Chinese territorial waters during the Shanghai Incident.
 February 5 – The first air-to-air clash of the Shanghai Incident takes place, between five Japanese aircraft from the aircraft carrier Hōshō and nine Nationalist Chinese fighters.
 February 14 – Ruth Nichols sets a new altitude record for a diesel-powered aircraft,  in a modified Lockheed Vega.
 February 22 – During the Shanghai Incident, three Imperial Japanese Navy Nakajima A1N2 fighters from the aircraft carrier Kaga score the first air-to-air kill in Japanese history, shooting down a Nationalist Chinese Boeing fighter piloted by an American volunteer.

March
 During the German election campaign of March–April 1932, Adolf Hitler becomes the first politician in history to use air travel to make political campaign appearances in several cities and towns possible in a single day, flying with planes operated by Deutsche Luft Hansa. Before the campaign ends in the election of April 10, 1932, Hitler will speak in 46 cities and towns during two one-week-long "Flights Over Germany."
 The final Avro 504 leaves the production line. The type has been in continuous production for nineteen years.
 March 6 – The Couzinet 33 passenger aircraft Biarritz sets out from France to establish the first air link between France and New Caledonia. 
 March 20 – Luftschiffbau Zeppelin begins regular transatlantic services between Germany and Recife, Brazil, using the dirigible Graf Zeppelin. The service will continue until 1936, averaging one round-trip per month.
 March 24–28 – Jim Mollison sets a new speed record between the United Kingdom and Cape Town, taking 4 days 17 hours in a de Havilland Puss Moth
 March 25 – Dobrolyot is expanded into a USSR-wide service and has its name changed to Aeroflot

April
 The Spanish airline LAPE begins operations.
 April 1 – Hillman's Airways begins its first scheduled service, flying between Romford and Clacton-on-Sea, England, using a de Havilland Puss Moth and a de Havilland Fox Moth.
 April 5 – The Couzinet 33 passenger aircraft Biarritz lands at La Tontouta, New Caledonia, establishing the first air link between France and New Caledonia. It had departed France on March 6.
 April 16 – Record-setting aviator Frank Hawks is injured and his  Travel Air Type R Mystery Ship Texaco 13 is badly damaged when he crashes on takeoff from a soggy field at Worcester, Massachusetts. He recovers and the airplane is repaired.
 April 19–28 – C. W. A. Scott sets a new solo speed record between the United Kingdom and Darwin, Australia, taking 8 days 20 hours in a de Havilland Gipsy Moth
 April 27 – Imperial Airways commences a regular passenger service to Cape Town, South Africa.

May
 The Egyptian Air Force is formed
 May 9 – Captain Albert Hegenberger makes the first completely blind solo flight entirely on instruments, in a Consolidated NY-2.
 May 11 – Tragedy strikes as the United States Navy dirigible  attempts to land in front of thousands of spectators at Camp Kearny in San Diego, California, after a 77-hour flight from Naval Air Station Lakehurst, New Jersey, when Akron suddenly lurches upward, surprising the sailors handling her lines.
 May 15 – 1932 Kimberley rescue: German pilot Hans Bertram and mechanic Adolph Klausmann, attempting a global circumnavigation eastabout in a Junkers W 33 seaplane, endure a storm in the Timor Sea, forcing them to land off a remote part of the Kimberley coast of north-western Australia. The stranded men spend almost six weeks severely deprived of food and water and are close to death when rescued by a search party of aborigines on June 22.
She had departed Nairobi on 24 April and flown via Sudan, Egypt, the Mediterranean Sea, and Europe in seven days of actual flying, with several forced landings and stops for engine repairs along the way. Despite having only 127 hours of flight time as a pilot before attempting the trip, she makes the flight without a radio and navigates by sight. She will make the return flight to Kenya a few months later.
 May 20–21 – Amelia Earhart, flying a Lockheed Vega, becomes the first woman to make a solo flight across the North Atlantic, flying from Harbour Grace in Newfoundland to Derry in Northern Ireland in 14 hours 54 minutes.

June
 June 7 – Misr Airlines, which later will become EgyptAir, is founded. It will begin flight operations in July 1933.
 June 24 – In the Soviet Union, Leningrad's Shosseynaya Airport (the future Pulkovo Airport) opens. Its first flight, an aircraft carrying passengers and mail, arrives late in the afternoon after a two-hour-and-a-half-hour flight from Moscow.
 June 29 – A Curtiss F9C Sparrowhawk parasite fighter hooks onto the U.S. Navy dirigible  for the first time.

July
 In an early use of air travel to make political campaign appearances in several cities and towns possible in a single day, Adolf Hitler makes his third "Flight Over Germany," a 14-day trip by air in which he makes appearances at 50 urban mass meetings. Hitler had pioneered the use of air travel in political campaigns with his first two "Flights Over Germany" during the March–April 1932 German election campaign.
 July 16 – During a flight from Santiago, Chile, to Governor Francisco Gabrielli International Airport in Mendoza, Argentina, the Pan American-Grace Airways (Panagra) Ford 5-AT-C Trimotor San José (registration NC403H) crashes on Chile's Cerro El Plomo in the  Andes Mountains during a severe snowstorm, killing all nine people on board. Buried in ice and snow, its wreckage will remain undiscovered until March 1934.
 July 21 – Wolfgang von Gronau sets out to make a round-the-world trip in a Dornier Wal. One hundred and eleven days later, it will be the first such trip made in a flying boat.
 July 23 – Aviation pioneer Alberto Santos-Dumont hangs himself.

August
 August 14–28 – The third International Tourist Aircraft Contest Challenge 1932 takes place in Berlin. The Polish crew of Franciszek Zwirko and Stanislaw Wigura win it in the RWD-6 plane.
 August 14–23 – Frances Mersalis and Louise Thaden set a women's flight endurance record of 8 days 4 hours.
 August 18–19 – Jim Mollison makes the first solo east-to-west crossing of the Atlantic, flying his de Havilland Puss Moth G-ABXY The Heart's Content from near Dublin to New Brunswick.
 August 21–27 – The  Challenge 1932 air race over Europe takes place.
 August 23 – Panama establishes its Civil Aviation Authority.
 August 24–25 – Amelia Earhart becomes the first woman to make a nonstop solo flight across North America, flying from Los Angeles, California, to Newark, New Jersey.

September
 September 5 – Movie stunt pilot Al Wilson is killed in his 1910 pusher biplane after a collision with an autogiro.
 September 11 – The Challenge 1932 winners, Polish pilots Franciszek Zwirko and Stanislaw Wigura, die in an air crash.
 September 20 – Transcontinental and Western Air signs a contract with Douglas Aircraft for the development of the Douglas Commercial Model 1, or Douglas DC-1. A revolutionary all-metal twin-engine airliner, the DC-1 soon will give rise to the Douglas DC-2 and the legendary Douglas DC-3.

October
 October 7 – First flight of the Stipa-Caproni, a prototype aircraft employing Luigi Stipas "intubed propeller" concept, a forerunner of jet propulsion and the ducted fan for aircraft.
 October 8 – The Indian Air Force is founded as an auxiliary air force of the Indian Empire.
 October 15 – Tata Sons opens an airmail route between Karachi and Madras, the first regular air service within India and origin of Air India.
 October 18 – As French aviator Jean Marmoz takes off from Istres, France, in the Bernard 81 GR to attempt to set a new unrefueled nonstop closed-circuit world distance record, he notices slackness and vibration in the ailerons and large oscillations of the wings. He dumps fuel and aborts the flight.

November
 November 10 – British Prime Minister Stanley Baldwin states in a speech that "The bomber will always get through."
 November 14–18 – Amy Johnson breaks the United Kingdom-to-Cape Town speed record, shaving 11 hours off Mollison's record set in March. She flies a de Havilland Puss Moth.
 November 19 – A national monument to the Wright Brothers is unveiled in the United States at Kitty Hawk, North Carolina.

December
 December 1 – Pan American World Airways announces plans to offer service to Hawaii.
 December 22 – During the Chaco War, three Bolivian Air Corps aircraft – two Curtiss-Wright CW-14 Osprey and a Curtiss P-6 Hawk – make three bombing and strafing passes against the Paraguayan Navy gunboat ARP Tacuary while she is at anchor in the Paraguay River at Bahía Negra, Paraguay; they drop 15 bombs, 11 of which straddle Tacuary. Tacuary hits one of the CW-14s with a  shell, and the CW-14 crashes shortly afterwards in Brazil.
 December 24 – The two Bolivian Air Corps aircraft – a CW-14 Osprey and a P-6 Hawk – that survived the 22 December airstrike against the Paraguayan Navy gunboat ARP Tacuary at Bahía Negra return to attack her there again. This time Tacuary takes evasive action. None of the bombs the two aircraft drop hit Tacuary, but their strafing runs against her wound several of her crewmen. The 22 and 24 December attacks against Tacuary have combined to leave 29 splinter holes and 45 bullet holes in her hull.

First flights 
Arado Ar 66
Bellanca XSE
Fairchild 24
Farman F.211
Focke-Wulf A 43
Focke-Wulf Fw 43
IMAM Ro.26
Mitsubishi Ki-20
Piaggio P.10
Pitcairn OP
Pitcairn PA-18
Westland-Hill Pterodactyl Mk. V
Early 1932 – Saro_Percival Mailplane, later redesigned as the Spartan Cruiser
Late summer – Focke-Wulf Fw 44

January
 January 29 - De Havilland Fox Moth

February
 Aichi AB-3
 February 11 – Couzinet 70
 February 16 - Martin B-10 
 February 24 – Latécoère 500

March
 Junkers Ju 46
 March 7 – Junkers Ju 52/3m
 March 20 – Boeing P-26 Peashooter
 March 25 – Curtiss XF11C-2, prototype of the Curtiss F11C Goshawk, the last Curtiss fighter to go into production for the United States Navy

April
 Curtiss XP-23 Hawk, last biplane built for the United States Army Air Corps

May
 Aichi AB-4
 May 7 – Dornier Do 11
 May 22 – General Aviation GA-43
 May 26 – Farman F.220, prototype of the Farman F.221, Farman F.222, Farman F.223, and SNCAC NC.223

June
 Boeing-Canada A-213 Totem
 Potez 430, prototype of the Potez 43 family.
 June 3 – RWD-6
 June 6 – Armstrong Whitworth Atalanta
 June 18 – Dewoitine D.500
 June 23 – Dornier Do 12
 June 25 – Farman F.1000

July
 Abrial A-12 Bagoas
 Curtiss XP-934, later purchased by the United States Army Air Corps as the Curtiss XP-31 Swift, the first monoplane design by Curtiss
 July 8 – Supermarine Scapa

August
 Farman F.1010
 Fieseler F 4
 Miles M.1 Satyr
 Mitsubishi Ki-1
 August 13 – Gee Bee R-1

September
 Albatros L102
Pitcairn PA-19
 September 30 – Blackburn Baffin

October
 Levasseur PL.15
 October 7 – Stipa-Caproni
 October 19 – Mitsubishi 3MT5

November
 November 4 – Beech Staggerwing
 November 8 – Junkers Ju 60
 November 19 – ANF Les Mureau 170C.1
 November 24 – De Havilland Dragon

December
 Consolidated Y1P-25
 Couzinet 22
 December 1 – Heinkel He 70
 December 21 – Vickers Vincent

Entered service 
 Avro 643 Cadet
Hall PH-1 with United States Navy Patrol Squadron 8 (VP-8)
Saunders A.7 Severn with No. 209 Squadron, Royal Air Force
Tupolev TB-3 with the Soviet Air Force

February
 De Havilland Tiger Moth with RAF Central Flying School.

March
 March 1 – Berliner-Joyce P-16 (later PB-1) with United States Army Air Corps

April
 Junkers Ju 46 with Deutsche Luft Hansa

September
 Curtiss F9C Sparrowhawk aboard

December
 Focke-Wulf Fw 47 with German meteorological stations
 PZL P.7a in the Polish Air Force

Retirements 
 Airco DH.9C by Northern Air Lines
 Breguet 14 by the French Armys Aéronautique Militaire.
 Levasseur PL.2 by French Naval Aviation

References

 
Aviation by year